Crassispira pellisphocae is a species of sea snail, a marine gastropod mollusk in the family Pseudomelatomidae.

Description
The length of the shell varies between 7 mm and 11 mm.

The small shell has a warm yellow brown color. It has a blunt short smooth protoconch of a 1½ whorl, followed by five or more subsequent moderately rounded whorls. The suture is distinct, appressed and moderately constricted with three or four fine spiral striae on the fasciole. The spiral sculpture consists of (on the penultimate whorl between the fasciole and the succeeding suture about six) fine equal, equally spaced threads, with narrower deep interspaces, forming minute nodules where they cross the ribs. On the body whorl the threading continues hardly altered, to the end of the siphonal canal. The axial sculpture consists of (on the penultimate whorl about 35) narrow ribs with subequal interspaces, extended from the fasciole to the siphonal canal, forming a very uniform reticulation over the whole surface. The aperture (the outer lip defective) is rather wide. The inner lip is erased. The whitish columella is short, stout,. The siphonal canal is very short and wide, hardly differentiated from the aperture.

Distribution
This species occurs in the Sea of Cortez, Western Mexico; off the Virgin Islands; St Vincent; Aruba; off Western Africa and in the Alborán Sea, Western Mediterranean Sea.

References

 Lea, H. C. 1841. Descriptions of some new species of fossil shells from the Eocene at Claiborne, Alabama. American Journal of Science and Arts, series 1, 40(9):92–103, 1 pl
 Fallon P.J. (2011) Descriptions and illustrations of some new and poorly known turrids (Turridae) of the tropical northwestern Atlantic. Part 2. Genus Crassispira Swainson, 1840, subgenera Monilispira Bartsch & Rehder, 1939 and Dallspira Bartsch, 1950. The Nautilus 125(1): 15–28

External links
 
 
 De Jong K.M. & Coomans H.E. (1988) Marine gastropods from Curaçao, Aruba and Bonaire. Leiden: E.J. Brill. 261 pp. 

pellisphocae
Gastropods described in 1845